McCallum is a Scottish surname, meaning in Gaelic "Son of Columba". Thought to be a member of the Ui Neill and possibly a member of its sub kingdom the Cenel Eoghain commonly found through Ulster and the western isles of Scotland.

Notable people with the surname include:

 Alison McCallum (born 1951), Australian rock singer
 Andrew McCallum, American computer scientist
 Angela McCallum, Trump campaign executive assistant
 Arnold McCallum (20th century), Northwest Territories politician
 Barney McCallum (1926–2019), given name David Brace McCallum, coinventor of the racket sport pickleball
 Bennett McCallum (born 1935), American economist
 Collette McCallum (born 1986), Australia women's football player
 Daniel McCallum (1815–1878), railroad engineer and manager
 David McCallum (born 1933), British actor
 David McCallum, Sr. (1897–1972), British violinist
 David McCallum (wrongful conviction) (born 1969), convicted murderer, exonerated of the charges after 29 years in prison after the murder of Nathan Blenner in 1985 
 Don McCallum, artist, historian, and art critic
 Doug McCallum (21st century), former mayor of Surrey, British Columbia
 Dunc McCallum (1940–1983), retired professional ice hockey player
 Duncan McCallum (1888–1958), British Conservative politician
 Eileen McCallum (born 1936), Scottish actress
 Frank McCallum (died 1857), notorious bushranger
 Gavin McCallum (born 1987), Canadian footballer
 Grace McCallum (born 2002), American artistic gymnast
 Gordon McCallum (1919–1989) American sound engineer
 H McCallum (20th century), rugby league player
 Henry Edward McCallum (1852–1919), Newfoundland colonial leader
 Hiram E. McCallum (1900–1989), mayor of Toronto, Ontario
 Ian McCallum (born 1965), guitarist
 Jack McCallum, American sports writer
 James McCallum (cyclist) (born 1979), racing cyclist
 James McCallum (politician) (1806–1889), member of the Confederate House of Representatives
 Jay McCallum (born 1960), Louisiana state district court judge and former state representative
 Joanna McCallum (21st century), British theatre, film and television actress
 John McCallum (born 1950), Canadian politician, economist and university professor
 John McCallum (actor) (born 1917), Australian film actor
 John McCallum (sports writer) (born 1924)
 Joseph S. McCallum (20th century), Alberta politician
 Karen McCallum, American bridge player
 Lachlin McCallum (1823–1903), Canadian politician
 Lucy McCallum, Australian judge
 Mike McCallum (born 1956), retired boxer
 Napoleon McCallum (born 1963), former professional American footballer
 Neil McCallum (disambiguation), multiple people
 Nick McCallum (21st century), Australian journalist
 Pat McCallum (born 1969), curler
 Paul McCallum (Canadian football) (born 1970), professional Canadian football player
 Paul McCallum (footballer), English footballer
 Peter Duncan McCallum (born 1853), Ontario farmer and political figure
 R. B. McCallum (1898–1973), British historian at Oxford University
 Ray McCallum (born 1961), former player and head coach of the University of Detroit's basketball team
 Ray McCallum, Jr. (born 1991), professional NBA basketball player (Sacramento Kings)
 Richard McCallum (born 1984) Jamaican footballer 
 Richard McCallum (born 1863) New Zealand Liberal politician
 Rick McCallum (born 1952), film producer
 Robert McCallum, Jr. (born 1946), United States Ambassador to Australia
 Robin McCallum (21st century), British weather presenter
 Ron McCallum (born 1948), Australian legal academic
 Sally McCallum (born 1940), retired female track and field athlete
 Scott McCallum (born 1950), 43rd Governor of Wisconsin
 Stephanie McCallum (born 1956), classical pianist
 Thomas McCallum (1860–1938) pastoralist and politician in South Australia
 Trevor McCallum (21st century), former professional soccer player

See also
 McCollum (surname)
 Clan Malcolm